Christine Aschenberg-Dugnus (born 22 September 1959) is a German lawyer and politician of the Free Democratic Party (FDP) who has been serving as a member of the Bundestag from the state of Schleswig-Holstein since 2017.

Early life and career 
After graduating from high school in Kassel, Aschenberg-Dugnus began studying economics at the Gesamthochschule Kassel in 1978, but moved to University of Marburg in 1979, where she studied law until 1985. From 1992 until 2001, she worked at the University of Kiel. Since 2001, she has been running her own law firm in Strande.

Political career
Aschenberg-Dugnus has been a member of the FDP since 1997.

Aschenberg-Dugnus was a member of the German Bundestag from 2009 to 2013, representing the Rendsburg-Eckernförde district. During that time, she served on the Health Committee and the Committee on Legal Affairs.

In the 2017 elections, Aschenberg-Dugnus returned to the Bundestag. She has since been serving on the Health Committee. Since March 2018, she has been her parliamentary group's health policy spokesperson. Since 2019, she has also been a member of the German delegation to the Franco-German Parliamentary Assembly.

In the negotiations to form a so-called traffic light coalition of the Social Democrats (SPD), the Green Party and the FDP following the 2021 federal elections, Aschenberg-Dugnus led her party's delegation in the working group on health policy; her co-chairs from the other parties were Katja Pähle and Maria Klein-Schmeink.

Other activities
 Deutsche Maritime Akademie, member of the Advisory Board

Political positions
Amid the emergence of the SARS-CoV-2 Omicron variant in Germany in late 2021, Aschenberg-Dugnus was one of 22 members of the FDP parliamentary group who advocated against the introduction of a COVID-19 vaccine mandate.

References

External links 

  
 Bundestag biography 

1959 births
Living people
Members of the Bundestag for Schleswig-Holstein
Female members of the Bundestag
21st-century German women politicians
Members of the Bundestag 2021–2025
Members of the Bundestag 2017–2021
Members of the Bundestag 2009–2013
Members of the Bundestag for the Free Democratic Party (Germany)